The 2011 World Artistic Gymnastics Championships were held in Tokyo, Japan, from October 7–16, 2011, at the Tokyo Metropolitan Gymnasium. 
Due to uncertainty over the nuclear situation following the 2011 Tōhoku earthquake and tsunami, the International Federation of Gymnastics revealed it was considering moving the event, but on May 22 FIG president Bruno Grandi announced that the World Championships would take place in Tokyo as planned.

Participating countries

83 countries participated, which included gymnasts from

       Albania
         Argentina
       Armenia
         Australia
       Austria
    Azerbaijan
    Bangladesh
       Belarus
       Belgium
       Brazil
       Bulgaria
       Canada
        Chile
        China
        Chinese Taipei
         Colombia
         Costa Rica
           Croatia
           Cyprus
           Czech Republic
           Denmark
           Dominican Republic
          Egypt
           El Salvador
          Finland
          France
          Georgia
           Germany
           Greece
           Guatemala
           Hong Kong
           Hungary
           Iceland
           India
          Indonesia
           Ireland
           Israel
           Italy
           Jamaica
           Japan
           Kazakhstan
           Kuwait
           Latvia
           Lithuania
           Luxembourg
           Malaysia
           Mexico
           Monaco
           Mongolia
            Namibia
           Netherlands
           New Zealand
           Norway
           Peru
           Philippines
           Poland
           Portugal
           Puerto Rico
           Qatar
           Romania
           Russia
           Saudi Arabia
           Serbia
           Singapore
           Slovakia
           Slovenia
          South Africa
          South Korea
           Spain
           Sweden
           Switzerland
           Thailand
           Trinidad and Tobago
           Tunisia
           Turkey
           Ukraine
           United Kingdom
           United States
           Uzbekistan
           Venezuela
           Vietnam

Olympic qualification

Teams
This event was the first qualifying stage for the 2012 Summer Olympics, which were held in London. The top 24 men's and women's teams from the 2010 World Artistic Gymnastics Championships were allowed to send a full team of gymnasts. The top 8 men's and women's teams directly qualified for the team events at the 2012 Olympics. Teams placed 9th to 16th got a second chance to qualify a full team at the Olympic Test Event on January 10–18, 2012, from which four men's and women's teams qualified.

Individuals
The winners of gold, silver and bronze medals in each apparatus qualified for the Olympics, either as individuals or as members of their national team. Additional individual gymnasts qualified from the Test Event in January.

Competition schedule
All times are JST (UTC+9).

Oldest and youngest competitors

Medalists

Women's results

Qualification 
2011 World Artistic Gymnastics Championships – Women's qualification

Team all-around 

In the qualifying round, 5 gymnasts performed on each apparatus, and the top 4 scores were counted towards the team's total. The top 8 teams qualified to the final.

In the final round, held on October 11, only 3 gymnasts performed on each apparatus, and all the scores counted. The United States team won the gold medal with solid performances by all gymnasts on all apparatus, while the Russian team made several mistakes and finished a distant second. China narrowly beat Romania to win the bronze medal, followed by Great Britain in fifth place. This was the highest ranking finish Great Britain had ever had for a team at a World Championship.

Oldest and youngest competitors

Controversy

During the presentation of medals, the National Anthem of the United States was abruptly ended, causing some frustration amongst both the coaches and the gymnasts themselves.

Alicia Sacramone injured her Achilles tendon during the last podium training and had already left Japan when the Team Final started. However, US National Team Coordinator Marta Karolyi opted to keep her on the roster instead of officially naming alternate Anna Li to the team and subsequently competed with only 5 instead of the usual 6 gymnasts. This led to Sacramone receiving her tenth World Championships medal and officially becoming the US gymnast with the most World Championship medals. As Sacramone was not present during the competition, Li dressed, supported the team on the floor, and accepted the team medal for Sacramone. Li later passed the medal on to Sacramone and received (as customary for the World team alternates) a copy from USAG.

Individual all-around 
The final was held on October 13. None of the medalists from the previous year were able to compete to defend their title as the gold and bronze medalists—Aliya Mustafina and Rebecca Bross, respectively—were both unable to compete at worlds due to knee injuries, and silver medalist Jiang Yuyuan did not qualify high enough over her teammates. A number of gymnasts ranked high enough to make the all-around final, but did not qualify due to the two-per-country rule. All the gymnasts from the USA that competed in the preliminary round ranked in the top 24. The gymnasts affected were Gabby Douglas (5th), Sabrina Vega (9th), and McKayla Maroney (12th) of the United States. Also affected were Tan Sixin (15th) and Jiang Yuyuan (20th) of China, Yuko Shintake (21st) and Yu Minobe (23rd) of Japan, and Anna Dementyeva (31st) of Russia. The last gymnast to qualify was Carlotta Ferlito, who ranked 32nd in the preliminary competition.

Oldest and youngest competitors

Vault 
Phan's bronze medal was the first medal for Vietnam at a World Championships. Maroney's performance secured the third consecutive World gold medal for the USA on women's vault following Kayla Williams in 2009 and teammate Alicia Sacramone in 2010. Chusovitina's silver was her 11th world medal (her 9th vault world medal). As her first world championships was in Indianapolis in 1991, she has been competing at an international level since before her fellow vault finalists were born.

Oldest and youngest competitors

 Yamilet Peña attempted a handspring double front vault, which has a 7.1 D Value score, but because she landed on her back, she scored a 0.000.

Uneven bars 

Oldest and youngest competitors

Balance beam 

Oldest and youngest competitors

Floor

Oldest and youngest competitors

On the day before the competition, it was announced that Diana Bulimar injured her foot, and first reserve Lauren Mitchell would take her place in the final. Shortly after the women's beam competition, it was announced that Russia decided to pull Viktoria Komova from the competition to give her teammate (and second reserve) Ksenia Afanasyeva a chance to compete in the final instead. During warm up Vanessa Ferrari injured herself; so, third reserve Diana Chelaru was quickly added to replace her.

Men's results

Qualifications

Team all-around 

In the qualifying round, 5 gymnasts performed on each apparatus, and the top 4 scores counted towards the team's total. The top 8 teams qualified for the final.

In the final round, held on October 12, only 3 gymnasts performed on each apparatus, and all the scores were counted. The Chinese team won the title for the fifth successive time, benefiting from crucial mistakes by the last 2 Japanese gymnasts. Japan was still able to win the silver medal, with a margin of only 0.010 point from the United States in bronze medal position.

Oldest and youngest competitors

 Berbecar landed on his back, therefore scored a 0.000.

Individual all-around 
The all-around final was held on October 14. Three gymnasts had ranked high enough to qualify, but were not allowed to compete due to the two-per-country rule. The affected gymnasts were Jonathan Horton (5th), Fabian Hambüchen (19th) and Steven Legendre (24th). On the day of the final, Marian Drăgulescu pulled out of the competition and Nathan Gafuik took his place.

Oldest and youngest competitors

Floor 
The final for Men's Floor Exercise took place on October 15. Marian Drăgulescu had qualified in 2nd, but pulled out of the competition on the morning of the final. As the first reserve, Jake Dalton (USA) took his place. There was also an inquiry made by the Japanese coaches into the scoring when Kōhei Uchimura's difficulty score was only awarded a 6.500 because they had mistaken a triple twisting move for a double twisting move. The inquiry was accepted by the judges, and the score adjusted accordingly, which gave Uchimura the gold medal.

Oldest and youngest competitors

Pommel horse 

Oldest and youngest competitors

Rings 

Oldest and youngest competitors

Vault 
Originally, Marian Drăgulescu was to compete in this final, but had to pull out of competition due to an injury. Denis Ablyazin replaced him in the final as the first reserve.

Oldest and youngest competitors

Parallel bars

Oldest and youngest competitors

Horizontal bar

Oldest and youngest competitors

Medal table

Overall

Men

Women

References

External links

Sportcentric Site
Federation International Gymnastics 2011 Tokyo Results
Complete Qualification System London 2012

 
World Artistic Gymnastics Championships
World Artistic Gymnastics Championships
World Artistic Gymnastics Championships
International gymnastics competitions hosted by Japan